Bryodelphax meronensis is a species of tardigrade in the genus Bryodelphax which belongs to the family Echiniscidae. The species is endemic to Israel and is found in the area of Mount Meron. The species was first described by Giovanni Pilato, Oscar Lisi and Maria Grazia Binda in 2011. The specific name comes from the location where it was discovered.

References

Echiniscidae
Invertebrates of Israel
Endemic fauna of Israel
Animals described in 2010
Taxa named by Giovanni Pilato
Taxa named by Oscar Lisi
Taxa named by Maria Grazia Binda